The following elections occurred in the year 1833.

Europe
 1833 Belgian general election

North America
1833 Bahamian general election
1833 Costa Rican Head of State election

United States
 United States Senate election in New York, 1833
 United States Senate special election in New York, 1833

South America
1833 Colombian presidential election

See also
 :Category:1833 elections

1833
1833 elections
Elections